Bonafied is a studio album by Cameroonian jazz bassist and musician Richard Bona. It was released on 22 April 2013 through Universal Music.

The album has charted at number 33 in Poland and number 162 in France.

Track listing

Charts and certifications

Weekly charts

Certifications

References

2013 albums
Richard Bona albums